Holy Trinity Cathedral is an Anglican Cathedral in Port of Spain, the capital of Trinidad and Tobago.

History
Trinidad was invaded by the British in 1797. The population of the island was 17,643.
The corner stone of the church was laid in 1816. It was consecrated in 1823.

Architecture
The design, which has a strong neo-Gothic element, is credited to Philip Reinagle (son of the painter of the same name).

Interior
There is a hammerbeam roof.
The organ is by J. W. Walker & Sons Ltd, a British firm.

Gallery

Administration
From 1824 until 1872 Trinidad was administered by the Bishop of Barbados.
The Anglican Diocese of Trinidad and Tobago was set up in 1872.
In 1908, an anonymous gift of a site in Port of Spain enabled construction to begin on Hayes Court, a house for the bishop.

The current dean and rector is the Very Reverend Dr. Shelley-Ann Tenia. She previously served as a rector in Curepe.

References

Buildings and structures in Port of Spain
Cathedrals in Trinidad and Tobago
Anglican cathedrals in the Caribbean
1816 establishments in the British Empire
Gothic Revival architecture in Trinidad and Tobago
Tourist attractions in Port of Spain